Sher Ali Oglan was a son of Muhammad Khan of Moghulistan. According to Moghul historian Mirza Muhammad Haidar Dughlat he was a wealthy prince. He never became Khan of Moghulistan but his son Uwais Khan was khan of Moghulistan.

Genealogy of Chaghatai Khanate

In Babr Nama written by Babur, Page 19, Chapter 1; described genealogy of his maternal grandfather Yunas Khan as:

"Yunas Khan descended from Chaghatal Khan, the second son of Chingiz Khan (as follows,) Yunas Khan, son of Wais Khan, son of Sher-'ali Aughldn, son of Muhammad Khan, son of Khizr Khwaja Khan, son of Tughluq-timur Khan, son of Aisan-bugha Khan, son of Dawa Khan, son of Baraq Khan, son of Yesuntawa Khan, son of Muatukan, son of Chaghatal Khan, son of Chingiz Khan"

References

15th-century Mongolian people
Borjigin